The Debut of Thomas Cat (also spelled Kat and Katt in various sources) was the first color animated cartoon made in the United States. It was produced by Earl Hurd for Bray Pictures using the Brewster Color film process, and was released on February 8, 1920.

Plot 
The plot involves a kitten encountering a rat for the first time, rather than the mice it is used to.

Reception 
Despite favorable reviews, Bray Pictures deemed the process to be too expensive, and did not employ it again.

References

External links 
 

1920 films
1920 animated films
1920 short films
1920s American animated films
1920s animated short films
1920s color films
American animated short films
American silent short films
Animated films about cats
Silent films in color
Bray Productions films